Bandipotu may refer to:
 Bandipotu (2015 film), an Indian Telugu-language heist comedy film
 Bandipotu (1963 film), an Indian Telugu-language swashbuckler film